David Donald Mulford (August 27, 1915 – March 20, 2000) served in the California State Assembly for the 16th and 18th district from 1958 to 1971. During World War II he also served in the United States Army.

The Mulford Act, named after Don Mulford, was a 1967 California bill that prohibited the carrying of loaded firearms in public. The bill attracted national attention when the Black Panthers marched on the California Capitol to protest the bill.

References

External links
California State Archives Oral History of Mulford
Join California Profile Don Mulford

1915 births
2000 deaths
20th-century American politicians
United States Army personnel of World War II
Republican Party members of the California State Assembly
People from Oakland, California
People from Piedmont, California
United States Army officers
University of California, Berkeley alumni
University of California, Hastings College of the Law alumni
Military personnel from California